Southern Catholic College was a private, co-educational Roman Catholic four-year college located in Dawsonville, Georgia. It was founded in 2000 by Thomas J. Clements and the first classes were held in the fall of 2005 and its last classes were held in April 2010.  The college was located within the Archdiocese of Atlanta.  Southern Catholic was authorized by the Nonpublic Postsecondary Education Commission of the state of Georgia and was preaccredited by the American Academy for Liberal Education, located in Washington, D.C.

In April 2010 school president Fr. Shawn Aaron announced the school would be closing due to a lack of funding.

Presidents
Dr. Jeremiah J. Ashcroft 2002 - 2009
Fr. Shawn Aaron, LC 2009 - 2010

References

External links
Southern Catholic College Under Legion Direction

Education in Dawson County, Georgia
Educational institutions established in 2000
Defunct Catholic universities and colleges in the United States
Defunct private universities and colleges in Georgia (U.S. state)
Legion of Christ
Regnum Christi
Roman Catholic Archdiocese of Atlanta
Educational institutions disestablished in 2010
Catholic universities and colleges in Georgia (U.S. state)
2000 establishments in Georgia (U.S. state)
2010 disestablishments in Georgia (U.S. state)